Get a Life is a 2001 Portuguese drama film directed by João Canijo. It was screened in the Un Certain Regard section at the 2001 Cannes Film Festival.

Cast
 Rita Blanco - Cidália
 Adriano Luz - Adelino
 Teresa Madruga - Celestina
 Alda Gomes - Alda
 Olivier Leite - Orlando
 Maria David - Lùcia
 Yvette Caldas - Fàtima
 Jinie Rainho - Jinie
 Adélia Baltazar - Fernanda
 Luis Rego - Adérito
 Antonio Ferreira - Manuel
 Tiago Manaïa - Alvaro
 José Raposo
 Teresa Roby

References

External links

2001 films
2000s Portuguese-language films
2001 drama films
Films directed by João Canijo
Films produced by Paulo Branco
Portuguese drama films